Scaphella contoyensis is a species of sea snail, a marine gastropod mollusk in the family Volutidae, the volutes.

Description

Distribution
Gulf of Mexico, Yucatán area.

References

Volutidae
Gastropods described in 1979